Luis Alberto García Brito (born 19 April 1995 in Santo Domingo) is a Dominican Olympic weightlifter. He represented his country at the 2016 Summer Olympics.

Career
García won two silver medal in the 2014 Central American and Caribbean Games hel in Veracruz, Mexico, taking part in the 56 kg category.

In his participation in the 2015 Pan American Games he won the 56 kg category bronze medal, lifting 115 kg in snatch, 141 kg in clean and jerk and a total of 256 kg. He won three gold medals in the 2015 Pan American Junior Championships in the 56 kg category. He won the snatch bronze medal in the 56 kg category of the 2016 Pan American Championships.

He represented the Dominican Republic at the 2020 Summer Olympics.

References

External links 
 

1995 births
Living people
Dominican Republic male weightlifters
Weightlifters at the 2015 Pan American Games
Weightlifters at the 2016 Summer Olympics
Olympic weightlifters of the Dominican Republic
Pan American Games bronze medalists for the Dominican Republic
Pan American Games medalists in weightlifting
Central American and Caribbean Games silver medalists for the Dominican Republic
Competitors at the 2014 Central American and Caribbean Games
Universiade medalists in weightlifting
Universiade medalists for the Dominican Republic
Weightlifters at the 2019 Pan American Games
Central American and Caribbean Games medalists in weightlifting
Medalists at the 2015 Pan American Games
Weightlifters at the 2020 Summer Olympics
20th-century Dominican Republic people
21st-century Dominican Republic people